Ali Qeshlaqi (also Romanized as ‘Alī Qeshlāqī; also known as ‘Alī Qeshlāq) is a village in Gharbi Rural District, in the Central District of Ardabil County, Ardabil Province, Iran. At the 2006 census, its population was 314, in 68 families.

References 

Towns and villages in Ardabil County